Head Case is an American sitcom starring Alexandra Wentworth as Dr. Elizabeth Goode, a therapist who treats Hollywood stars. Celebrities appear on the show as themselves. The show ran for three seasons, airing on the Starz TV Network, Wednesdays, at 10 p.m. ET. H. Scott Salinas composed the show's music.

Plot

Dr. Elizabeth Goode is a brash, unconventional and judgmental therapist and thus has become the "it" therapist to those in Hollywood that need some help. Her office is filled with a who's who world of entertainment, sport and music. And even though she is not your typical therapist, her patients always wind up returning for another session.

Cast

Main cast
 Alexandra Wentworth as Dr. Elizabeth Goode, a graduate magna cum laude from Wellesley College before earning her master's degree at Johns Hopkins University.
 Steve Landesberg as Freudian psychiatrist Dr. Myron Finkelstein, who shares an office with Goode.
 Michelle Arthur as Lola Buckingham, the British receptionist to Dr. Goode and Finkelstein.

Recurring cast
 Candace Brown as Goldie Finklestein
 Rob Benedict as Jeremy Berger
 Aris Alvarado as Ron Julio

Notable guest cameos

Pamela Adlon
Magali Amadei
Rosanna Arquette
Mario Batali
Dave Batista
Sandra Bernhard
Craig Bierko
Lance Burton
Marc Cherry
James Denton
Andy Dick
Tate Donovan
Illeana Douglas
Rich Eisen
Jennifer Finnigan
Rick Fox
Janeane Garofalo
Willie Garson
Natalie Garza
Nicole Garza
Jeff Goldblum
Macy Gray
David Alan Grier
Greg Grunberg
Geri Halliwell
Sean Hayes
Hugh Hefner
Jane Kaczmarek
Melina Kanakaredes
Richard Kind
Jason Lewis
Phill Lewis
Christopher Lloyd
Traci Lords
Shelby Lynne
Ralph Macchio
Joel Madden
Cindy Margolis
Dean McDermott
Anne Meara
Larry Miller
Isaac Mizrahi
Alanis Morissette
Kevin Nealon
Liz Phair
Paulina Porizkova
Monica Potter
Jason Priestley
Jeff Probst
Kevin Rahm
Jerry Seinfeld
Jonathan Silverman
Tom Sizemore
Ione Skye
Tori Spelling
Jerry Stiller
Trudie Styler
Nicole Sullivan
Tiffani Thiessen
Lea Thompson
Callie Thorne
Jeff Vespa
Fred Willard
Ahmet Zappa
Laura Kightlinger

Episodes

Season 1 (2007)

Season 2 (2008)

Season 3 (2009)

Home media
The first season was a series of ten 12-minute shorts, and are found on DVD as "bonus shorts" on Disc 2 of Starz/Anchor Bay's "Season 1" release (where Disc 1 has the eight 25-minute episodes of the second televised season).

References

External links
 

2000s American sitcoms
2007 American television series debuts
2009 American television series endings
Starz original programming
English-language television shows